Korunk (meaning Our Age in English) is a Hungarian language monthly cultural-literary-scientific magazine published in Cluj-Napoca, Romania.

History and profile
Korunk was founded by László Dienes in Cluj-Napoca in 1926. The magazine ceased publication in 1940, and began publication in 1957. In 1929 Gabor Gaal became its editor-in-chief. Ernö Gáll is the long-term editor-in-chief of the magazine who served in the post between 1957 and 1984.

The magazine has a Marxist political stance and progressive literary approach. It is published on a monthly basis.

References

External links
Official website

1926 establishments in Romania
Cultural magazines
Hungarian-language magazines
Political magazines published in Hungary
Magazines established in 1926
Marxist magazines
Mass media in Cluj-Napoca
Monthly magazines published in Romania
Political magazines published in Romania
Literary magazines published in Romania